East Timor–Malaysia relations or Malaysia–Timor-Leste relations are foreign relations between Malaysia and East Timor. Malaysia has an embassy in Dili, and East Timor has an embassy in Kuala Lumpur. Malaysia is supporting East Timor to be one of the members of ASEAN and towards becoming a democratic country.

History 
Since 1999, Malaysia has contributed to many UN peacekeeping missions on the country, such as one are the Operation Astute during the 2006 East Timorese crisis. Malaysia also has provided assistance to Timor-Leste in the area of
human resources development through various training programmes and providing assistance to East Timor in its nation building efforts. Currently, Malaysia has been consider by East Timorese as a model to develop their countries.

Economic relations 

Both countries are currently working together to expand the scope of co-operation and currently tangible signs of a Malaysian present on East Timor can be seen in the form of restaurants, a school teaching English and the supply of construction materials and spare parts for vehicles. In 2014, a memorandum of understanding on cooperative development and co-operation signed between the University of Malaysia Sabah and the National University of East Timor, a day before an MoU on healthcare been signed. The total trade between the two countries has increased from U$10 million in 2012 to U$21.2 million in 2013 and the East Timorese government has expressed their interest to work with the Malaysian counterparts in oil and gas sectors.

References 

 
Malaysia
Bilateral relations of Malaysia